St. Lucie West Centennial High School is a public high school in Port St. Lucie, Florida, United States, serving students in ninth through twelfth grades.

As of the 2014–15 school year, the school had an enrollment of 2,502 students and 125.0 classroom teachers (on an FTE basis), for a student–teacher ratio of 20.0:1. There were 1,181 students (47.2% of enrollment) eligible for free lunch and 171 (6.8% of students) eligible for reduced-cost lunch.

Sports
Sports offered at Centennial include:

Baseball (boys)
Basketball (girls and boys)
Bowling
State Championship in Girls' Bowling 2008
Cheerleading (sideline and competitive)
Eagle Music Department (Chorus, Concert Band, and Marching Band)
Cross Country
Flag Football
Football (boys)
Golf (girls and boys)
Soccer (girls and boys)
Softball (girls)
Swimming
Tennis
Track
Volleyball (girls)
Wrestling (boys)

Notable alumni
Notable people who attended the school include:
 Jamar Chaney,  American football linebacker
 Justin James, professional basketball player
 Omar Mateen, Islamic terrorist, mass murderer and perpetrator of the Orlando nightclub shooting
 Megan Fox, actress (Junior year. Did not graduate from WCHS)
 Fabrizio Scaccia, American football placekicker

References

External links
 Official website

High schools in St. Lucie County, Florida
Port St. Lucie, Florida
Public high schools in Florida